Javadabad District is in Varamin County, Tehran province, Iran. At the 2006 National Census, its population was 26,105 in 6,410 households. The following census in 2011 counted 24,280 people in 6,571 households. At the latest census in 2016, the district had 24,975 inhabitants in 7,443 households.

References 

Varamin County

Districts of Tehran Province

Populated places in Tehran Province

Populated places in Varamin County